Hyloidea is a superfamily of frogs. Hyloidea accounts for 54% of all living anuran species. The superfamily Hyloidea branched off from its closest relative, the Australobatrachia, during the mid-Cretaceous. The fossil evidence found during the Cretaceous-Paleogene extinction event could not determine the effects upon the frogs, due to the lack of fossils. Increased forestation erupted after this extinction, possibly leading to more arboreal adaptations of these anurans to be best suited for this habitat.

Taxonomy
Hyloidea contains the following subgroups:
Alsodidae  - (26 species)
Batrachylidae  - (14 species)
Bufonidae - true toads (700 species)
Brachycephaloides
Brachycephalidae  - saddleback toads, flea toads and big-headed frogs (70 species)
Craugastoridae  - fleshbelly frogs (822 species)
Eleutherodactylidae - robber frogs (223 species)
Centrolenids
Allophrynidae  - Tukeit Hill frogs (3 species)
Centrolenidae  - glass frogs (155 species)
Ceratophryidae  - common horned frogs (12 species)
Cycloramphidae  - glass frogs (36 species)
Dendrobatoidea
Dendrobatidae  - poison frogs (194 species)
Aromobatidae   - cryptic forest frogs (121 species)
Hemiphractidae  - (112 species)
Hylidae  - treefrogs (1036 species)
Hylodidae  - (47 species)
Leptodactylidae  - southern frogs (206 species)
Odontophrynidae  - (53 species)
Rhinodermatidae  - Darwin's frogs or mouth-brooding frogs (3  species)
Telmatobiidae  - water frogs (63 species)

Phylogenetic relationships 
Anurans all share a number of morphological characteristics, so researchers have had to use DNA testing to understand their relationships. ML and Bayesian analyses using a nuclear marker toolkit have resolved some of the relations of the anurans in Hyloidea. 53 out of the 55 previously established nodes on the phylogenetic tree were supported by this DNA testing. Analysis supports the Hyloidea being the sister group to the Australobatrachia, a clade of frogs containing species in Chile, Australia, and New Guinea. The common ancestor of both groups inhabited South America during the Early Cretaceous.

Shared characteristics
Hyloidea is the largest superfamily of anurans due to scientists placing frogs into this family when the relationships to others are unknown. Therefore, Hyloidea has the highest species diversity. Hyloidea are all tailless, have shortened bodies, large mouths and muscular hind legs. Most anurans in the superfamily have a lateral‐bender which is a type of pelvis morphology found in walking, hopping and burrowing frogs. Some species that appear later in the taxon have a sagittal‐hinge pelvis found in aquatic frogs as well as walking, hopping and burrowing frogs  and some have a fore–aft slider pelvis found in terrestrial frogs. Hyloidea anurans lack ribs, have complex mouthparts, and their pectoral girdle can be arciferal or firmisternal. They reproduce via axillary amplexus, and their larvae usually have a single spiracle. The average snout-vent length (SVL) of Hyloidea species vary widely, from 10 mm in one species of Diasporus to 320 mm in female Calyptocephalella gayi.

Distribution 
It's believed that Hyloidea first evolved on the Gondwanan supercontinent in what is now southern South America, then spread throughout the world. Today, they can be found in every continent except Antarctica, although in 2020 a roughly 40 million year old fossil from the hyloid family Calyptocephalellidae was discovered on Seymour Island in the Antarctic Peninsula. The distribution of Hyloidea species is highly correlated with climate, with most species found in areas with higher annual mean temperatures.

Conservation 
As of February 2021, out of the 3161 species of Hyloidea represented on the IUCN Red List, 361 were listed as critically endangered (11.4%), 475 as endangered (15%), and 310 as vulnerable (9.8%). Overall, one of the greatest threats to Hyloidea species is habitat loss due to agriculture.

References 

 
Neobatrachia
Vertebrate superfamilies